John Irving (born 1942) is an American novelist and Academy Award-winning screenwriter.

John Irving may also refer to:

John E. Irving (1932–2010), Canadian businessman
John Irving (basketball) (1953–2015), American college basketball player in the 1970s
John Irving (footballer, born 1867) (1867–1942), Lincoln City footballer in the 1890s
John Irving (footballer, born 1988), English footballer in the 21st century 
John Irving (MP) (1766–1845), MP for Antrim and Bramber
John Irving (Royal Navy officer), Scottish Royal Navy officer and member of the Franklin Expedition
John Irving (sailor) (1839–1???), American Civil War sailor and Medal of Honor recipient
John Irving (steamship captain) (1854–1936), Canadian steamship captain and politician in British Columbia
John J. Irving (c. 1863–1934), mayor of Binghamton, New York